Mihaela Valentina Cambei (born 18 November 2002) is a Romanian weightlifter. She won the bronze medal in the women's 49 kg event at the 2021 European Weightlifting Championships held in Moscow, Russia.

In 2018, she won the bronze medal in the 48 kg event at the Summer Youth Olympics held in Buenos Aires, Argentina.

At the 2019 European Junior & U23 Weightlifting Championships held in Bucharest, Romania, she won the silver medal in the women's junior 49 kg event in the Snatch, Clean & Jerk and Total. In 2021, she won the silver medal in her event at the Junior World Weightlifting Championships held in Tashkent, Uzbekistan.

She won the gold medal in her event at the 2022 European Junior & U23 Weightlifting Championships held in Durrës, Albania.

She won the silver medal in the women's 49kg Snatch event at the 2022 World Weightlifting Championships held in Bogotá, Colombia.

Achievements

References

External links 

 

Living people
2002 births
Place of birth missing (living people)
Romanian female weightlifters
Weightlifters at the 2018 Summer Youth Olympics
European Weightlifting Championships medalists
21st-century Romanian women